Saaroa may refer to:
Saaroa people
Saaroa language